L Sid is the second solo album by Leo Sidran.  It was released on February 15, 2000 on Go Jazz Records. It was the first album by Sidran dually composed in English and Castilian.

Track listing
All of the songs were written by Leo Sidran.
"43 Con Piña" - 4:39   
"What We Know" - 3:39  
"Home" - 3:39
"In The Stars" (En Las Estrellas) - 4:22  
"Better Off Alone" - 3:21
"Old Enough" - 4:42
"Pushing & Shoving" - 2:48 
"Sevillanas" - 3:44
"It Wasn't Supposed To Happen This Way" - 4:16    
"La Mitad" - 4:00
"Hypnotized" - 5:02 
"Gloria" - 4:02      
"I'm Gone" - 3:04      
"Enjoy Yourself" - 4:33     
"Times Before" - 3:38

Personnel

Performance
Mark Anderson – percussion
Anthony Cox – bass
Al Falaschi – Background vocals
Ken Holmen – tenor saxophone
Gordon Knudtson – Snare drums
Bob Malach – tenor saxophone
Michael Nelson – trombone, horn arrangements
Ricky Peterson – piano, keyboards, orchestration
Ben Sidran – piano, orchestration
Leo Sidran – guitar, vocals

Production
James Farber – mixing
Mark Haines – assistant engineer
George Marino – mastering
Ben Sidran – producer
Leo Sidran – producer, engineer
Steve Wiese – engineer
Mike Zirkel – engineer

External links

Leo Sidran albums
2000 albums
Spanish-language albums